Kiran Das (born 1 June 1983) is an Indian film editor who predominantly works in Malayalam cinema. He is a recipient of the Kerala State Film Award for Best Editor in 2019 for the movie Ishq (2019 film). His other notable works include Joji, Thondimuthalum Driksakshiyum, Joseph and Ambili

Filmography

Awards

References

External links 

People from Ernakulam district
Kerala State Film Awards
Living people
Film editing awards
1983 births